Parliamentary elections were held in the People's Republic of Albania on 20 September 1970. The Democratic Front was the only party able to contest the elections, and subsequently won all 264 seats with 100% of the vote. Voter turnout was reported to be 100%, with all registered voters voting.

Results

References

Parliamentary elections in Albania
Albania
1970 in Albania
One-party elections
Single-candidate elections
Albania